John Michael Atkin (1948–2008), born in Scunthorpe, Lincolnshire, England, was an English footballer who played as a half back in the Football League.

References

External links

1948 births
2008 deaths
English footballers
Sportspeople from Scunthorpe
Association football defenders
Scunthorpe United F.C. players
Gainsborough Trinity F.C. players
English Football League players